Tarphiota is a genus in the family of beetles known as Staphylinidae. There are at least three described species in Tarphiota.

Species
These three species belong to the genus Tarphiota:
 Tarphiota densa (Moore, 1978) i c g
 Tarphiota fucicola (Mäklin in Mannerheim, 1852) i c g b
 Tarphiota geniculata (Mäklin in Mannerheim, 1852) i c g b
Data sources: i = ITIS, c = Catalogue of Life, g = GBIF, b = Bugguide.net

References

Further reading

 
 
 
 
 
 

Aleocharinae
Articles created by Qbugbot